Richmond Township is a township in Franklin County, Kansas, USA.  As of the 2000 census, its population was 812.

Geography
According to the USGS, it contains one cemetery, Berea.

References
 USGS Geographic Names Information System (GNIS)

External links
 City-Data.com

Townships in Franklin County, Kansas
Townships in Kansas